Teluk Air Tawar is a suburb of Butterworth, located in North Seberang Perai district and north of the Butterworth city centre in Seberang Perai, Penang, Malaysia. Teluk Air Tawar means "Clear water bay" in the Malay language. This seaside town has a scenic view of George Town, Penang and Penang Island across the sea.

The town is located along the Malaysia Trunk Road 1 and has fast access to Sungai Petani, the largest city in Kedah for marketing. It also located in the middle of the Malaysian Federal Route 1. The Bertam exit is the north bound exit while the Sungai Dua exit is the south bound exit of the main road.

The town is home to the Royal Malaysian Air Force (RMAF) base. Nearby residential neighbourhoods include Taman Seri Senangan, Taman Wira, Taman Robina, Taman Telok Molek, Taman Pahlawan and Taman Bayu Aman. The town's postcode is 13050 Butterworth.

Highway Infrastructures

North bound
  from Hentian Sebelah Tikam Batu (Tikam Batu Side Stop)
  from Gurun Rest Area
  from Hentian Sebelah Kepala Batas

South bound
  from Sungai Juru Rest Area
  from Hentian Sebelah Sungai Bakap
  from Hentian Sebelah Alor Pongsu

See also
 Butterworth, Penang
 Penang
 Bagan Ajam

References

External links

Towns in Penang